Several ships have been named Juno for the Roman goddess Juno.

  was launched at Hull as a West Indiaman. French privateers once detained her and once captured her, but the Royal Navy recaptured her. She made one voyage as a whaler in the Southern Whale Fishery, and then participated as a transport in a naval expedition. She then disappears from readily accessible records.
  was an English merchantman launched at Lancaster. A French frigate captured her in a notable single-ship action in 1804 off the American coast and later burnt her.
 , a twin funnelled iron-built paddle steamer on the Bristol to Cork run (1868–1900)
 , a Clyde paddle steamer
 , a Clyde steamer, requisitioned to serve as the auxiliary minesweeper  HMS Helvellyn and declared a constructive loss after an enemy bombing raid over London in 1941

See also
  – one of two motor vessels
  – one of seven vessels of the Royal Navy

Ship names